Nirupam Sen (1947 — 2 July 2017) was from the 1969 batch of the Indian Foreign Service. His last posting prior to retirement was as Permanent Representative of India to the United Nations. After retirement, he was appointed as Special Senior Adviser to the President of the UN General Assembly.

Career

Sen presented his credentials as Permanent Representative of India to the United Nations on 17 September 2004. Prior to this appointment, Sen had been India's High Commissioner to Sri Lanka. He has previously headed Indian missions in Sofia and Oslo in Bulgaria and Norway. His predecessor as Permanent Representative of India to the United Nations was Vijay K. Nambiar his successor is Hardeep Puri.

Death 
Sen died in AMRI Hospitals, Kolkata on 24 December 2018 at the age of 71.

References

External links
The United Nations list of current heads of missions. (PDF)
Nirupam Sen made Special U.N. Adviser
The Deccan Herald

2017 deaths
1947 births
Indian officials of the United Nations
Permanent Representatives of India to the United Nations
People from Kolkata
Academic staff of the National Defence College, India